T. danae may refer to:
 Taningia danae, a squid species
 Tanysiptera danae, a kingfisher species

See also
 Danae (disambiguation)